Renaldo Lopes da Cruz (born 19 March 1970), known simply as Renaldo, is a Brazilian retired footballer who played as a forward.

Football career
Born in Cotegipe, Bahia, Renaldo played for more than 15 different clubs in his country, most notably for Clube Atlético Mineiro. During his entire career, he missed only two penalty kicks – both in the same match, a 3–0 home win against Figueirense Futebol Clube – and left for Spain in 1996 to sign with Deportivo de La Coruña. Also during that year, he earned his sole cap for the Brazil national team.

Upon his arrival in A Coruña, Renaldo said, while describing himself as a player: "I am like Ronaldo, but with an "e"". However, he grossly failed to live up to expectations, also spending time with three other teams in the country (all in Segunda División). In the following decade, a humorous Spanish website called Renaldinhos y Pavones was created, containing anecdotes on several national and foreign players which caught the eye for various reasons.

In 2002, Renaldo returned to his country to play for América Futebol Clube (MG). He continued to represent clubs in quick succession (he also had another spell abroad, in South Korea for FC Seoul), and finished his career in his 40s playing amateur football.

References

External links
 
 
 
 

1970 births
Living people
Brazilian footballers
Association football forwards
Campeonato Brasileiro Série A players
Campeonato Brasileiro Série B players
Club Athletico Paranaense players
Clube Atlético Mineiro players
Sport Club Corinthians Paulista players
América Futebol Clube (MG) players
Paraná Clube players
Sociedade Esportiva Palmeiras players
Coritiba Foot Ball Club players
Clube Náutico Capibaribe players
Brasiliense Futebol Clube players
La Liga players
Segunda División players
Deportivo de La Coruña players
UD Las Palmas players
UE Lleida players
CF Extremadura footballers
K League 1 players
FC Seoul players
Brazil international footballers
Brazilian expatriate footballers
Expatriate footballers in Spain
Expatriate footballers in South Korea
Brazilian expatriate sportspeople in Spain
Brazilian expatriate sportspeople in South Korea